Bride of the Storm (1926) is a silent historical adventure made at Warner Brothers, directed by J. Stuart Blackton, and starring Tyrone Power, Sr. and Dolores Costello. Sheldon Lewis plays Tyrone Power's son in this picture even though in real life, Lewis was a year older than Power.

The film appears to be among the  lost films of the 1920s.

Cast
 Dolores Costello as Faith Fitzhugh
John Harron as Dick Wayne
Otto Matieson as Hans Kroon
Sheldon Lewis as Piet Kroon
Tyrone Power, Sr. as Jacob Kroon
Julia Swayne Gordon as Faith's Mother
Yvonne Pelletier as Faith (age 8)
Ira McFadden as Heine Krutz
Tudor Owen as Funeral Harry
Fred Scott as Spike Mulligan
Donald Stuart as Angus McLain
Walter Tennyson as Ensign Clinton
Larry Steers as Commander, U.S.S. Baltimore

References

External links

Bride of the Storm at AllMovie

1926 films
American silent feature films
Films directed by J. Stuart Blackton
1920s historical adventure films
Lost American films
Warner Bros. films
American black-and-white films
Films set in the 19th century
American historical adventure films
1926 lost films
Seafaring films
Lost adventure films
1920s American films
Silent historical adventure films
1920s English-language films